Fox Interactive is an American video game publisher based in Los Angeles, California. The company published games based on 20th Century Fox properties, yet also published several original titles, such as Croc: Legend of the Gobbos.

History

20th Century Fox Home Entertainment (1994–2003) 

Fox Interactive was formed in May 1994, and was led by former Time Warner Interactive executive Ted Hoff, the company was a division of Fox Video, the home media distribution part of 20th Century Fox, and also distributed their titles. The first two games published by the new division were The Tick, based on the Fox Kids cartoon series of the same name, and The Pagemaster, based on the film of the same name.

On January 5, 1996, the company announced the release of Die Hard Trilogy for a August–September 1996 release window. On March 21, 1996, Fox Interactive signed a deal with Electronic Arts for distribution of their titles outside North America. The company would attend their first Electronic Entertainment Expo in 1996, and announced six mainstream titles during the event: The Simpsons Cartoon Studio, The Simpsons: Virtual Springfield and The X-Files for Windows and Macintosh, Aliens Versus Predator and Independence Day for PlayStation, Sega Saturn and Windows, and The Tick for PlayStation and Sega Saturn, alongside the already announced Die Hard Trilogy. The company also announced the launch of the Fox Toons Interactive label, consisting of educational games for Windows and Macintosh based on licensed properties, with the first five titles: Baby Felix, Hello Kitty Big Fun, Eekstravaganza,  The Tick and Keroppi being released within a Fall release window. In November 1996, the company announced the release of a CD-ROM based on Romeo + Juliet for December.

In February 1997, the company announced a video game based on Alien Resurrection for the PlayStation, Sega Saturn and PC, and two CD-ROM tie-in titles - The X-Files: Data Files, and Anastasia, based on the 1997 movie. In the same month, the company announced major marketing plans for Independence Day before the game's release on March 11 in the United States, including a multi-million dollar ad campaign. In April, the Fox Toons Interactive division announced the release of four more titles: Baby Felix Creativity Center, Hello Kitty Creativity Center, Danny and the Dinosaur and Frog and Toad are Friends, the latter two based on children's books. In May, Fox Interactive announced the acquisition of the publishing rights to Argonaut Software's Croc: Legend of the Gobbos, and announced to showcase it at E3 1997. During E3 in June, in addition to the previously announced titles, the Aliens Versus Predator title was announced for an Early 1998 release. The only newly announced title at E3 that year for the publisher was Aliens Online, developed by then-fellow News Corporation subsidiary Kesmai. On December 15, 1997, Fox Interactive formed a joint-venture with News Corporation's Fox Sports division and formed Fox Sports Interactive, which would be used to publish sports titles for consoles and computers. The company signed a long-term North American development agreement with Gremlin Interactive to re-name and publish some of the latter's Actua Sports titles for the North American market.

On April 15, 1998, the company announced to publish Gremlin's N20: Nitrous Oxide for the US market for a June 1998 release. The first two republished Actua Sports titles were also announced for the same release window - Fox Sports Soccer '99 and Fox Sports Golf '99. During E3 1998, the company acquired the rights to two more Gremlin titles - Team Losi: RC Racer and Motorhead, as well as also announcing Croc 2 for PlayStation and Windows, and Virtual K'Nex for CD-ROM. Other titles showcased included Aliens Versus Predator and several Fox Sports titles. In August, the company announced the CD-ROM title James Cameron's Titanic Explorer, based on the movie. In November 1998, the company delayed the releases of Alien Resurrection and Croc 2 to Mid-1999.

In May 1999, during E3, the company announced Activision as the exclusive worldwide distributor of Fox Sports Interactive titles in Europe, Asia and Africa, excluding Japan. Fox would continue to distribute and publish the titles in North America and Japan, and would not affect Electronic Arts' existing worldwide distribution deal with Fox's non-Sports titles. During the event, the company announced Die Hard Trilogy 2 and a video game based on Planet of the Apes., in addition to Croc 2 and Fox Sports Interactive title Fox Sports Pro Baseball 2000 . In July, a Game Boy Color version of Croc was announced for a Winter 1999 release window. In August 1999, the company was announced to be publishing two titles from Monolith Productions: Sanity: Aiken's Artifact, and The Operative: No One Lives Forever. On the same day, the company announced plans to release games for the PlayStation 2. In September 1999, the company announced to support the Dreamcast, announcing versions of Croc 2 and Planet of the Apes for the system, and a game based on World's Scariest Police Chases tentatively titled World's Scariest Police Chases: Deadly Pursuit.

On March 16, 2000, it was announced that THQ would publish the Game Boy Color version of Croc under license from Fox. In April, the company's Dreamcast games would be released at the end of 2000. and within the same month announced a full worldwide publishing deal with THQ for the company's Game Boy Color titles, with the additions of games based on The Simpsons, Buffy the Vampire Slayer, Aliens and Croc 2 in addition to the already announced Croc title. At E3 2000, in addition to several previously announced titles, the company announced Buffy the Vampire Slayer and World's Scariest Police Chases for the PlayStation, Dreamcast and Windows, and The Simpsons Wrestling and Titan AE for PlayStation. Dreamcast ports of Alien Resurrection and Sanity: Aiken's Artifact were announced, alongside the company's first PlayStation 2 projects, a port of The Operative: No One Lives Forever and Aliens: Colonial Marines. In July 2000, the company announced a sequel to Aliens Versus Predator as part of their deal with Monolith Productions. In August 2000, the company announced that the Dreamcast port of Croc 2 would be cancelled. In the same month, Unique Development Studios signed a deal to co-publish and develop a Futurama title with Fox for a 2002 release. In November 2000, the company announced a King of the Hill game that was released for Windows and Macintosh.

In January 2001, Fox Interactive announced they would start to focus more on development and would begin to co-publish their titles with a selection of well-known companies from then-on. Activision became the first of these publishing partners, acquiring US rights to The Simpsons Wrestling on March 13, and worldwide rights to World's Scariest Police Chases on April 20. The company also announced a reevaluation of their Dreamcast titles following Sega's announcement to discontinue the system., Eventually, the company canceled the Dreamcast versions of Alien Resurrection and World's Scariest Police Chases, and left Planet of the Apes and Buffy the Vampire Slayer in limbo. In April 2001, the company announced their plans for the Xbox, including a game based on Cops titled The Cops: Too Hot for TV, and a racing game based on The Simpsons. The already-announced Buffy the Vampire Slayer title was moved to the system as an exclusive, leaving the existing PlayStation and Dreamcast versions scrapped. During E3 2001, Fox Interactive announced four titles: The Simpsons: Road Rage, Die Hard: Nakatomi Plaza, Die Hard: Vendetta and No One Lives Forever 2: A Spy in H.A.R.M.'s Way, in addition to the previously announced Aliens: Colonial Marines, Buffy the Vampire Slayer, Cops: Too Hot for TV and the PlayStation 2 port of The Operative: No One Lives Forever. During E3 2001 the company announced that Electronic Arts would publish the Aliens, The Simpsons and Buffy titles, in addition to Vivendi Universal Interactive Publishing publishing the Die Hard, Cops and the No One Lives Forever titles, which was announced a week prior to E3. In August 2001, the company and DreamWorks SKG's consumer products division signed a 5-year publishing deal with Activision for the publication on games based on Minority Report.

At E3 2002, the company showcased three existing titles: No One Lives Forever 2, Die Hard: Vendetta and Buffy the Vampire Slayer, and announced two new titles: The Simpsons Skateboarding and a game based on the Dark Angel TV series. July 2002, the company signed another publishing deal with THQ to include Game Boy Advance titles, with a Buffy the Vampire Slayer title and a port of The Simpsons: Road Rage confirmed to be in development.

Vivendi Universal Games (2003–2006) 
In March 2003, 20th Century Fox sold the division to Vivendi Universal Games for an undisclosed amount. After being purchased, the name was reduced to solely being a label for 20th Century Fox games published by Vivendi Universal Games. The label would be phased out by 2006, although Vivendi Universal continued to publish titles based on 20th Century Fox properties, with such examples including Ice Age 2: The Meltdown, Eragon, and Aliens vs. Predator: Requiem. 20th Century Fox would later partner with other publishers to create games based on their properties, something which continues on to this day.

As of 2022, most of Fox Interactive's game library, which was copyrighted to 20th Century Fox, is owned by The Walt Disney Company through 20th Century Studios, while current video games based on 20th Century properties (which is owned by and operated under Disney since 2019) have been licensed out to third-party publishers on console and mobile devices.

Games

As a Publisher/Licensor

As a label of VU Games

Cancelled Titles

References

External links 
 
 

Video game development companies
Video game publishers
Defunct video game companies of the United States
The Walt Disney Company subsidiaries
Former Vivendi subsidiaries
Companies based in Los Angeles
Former News Corporation subsidiaries
Activision Blizzard
20th Century Studios
Video game companies disestablished in 1994
Video game companies disestablished in 2003
Companies based in Los Angeles County, California